Alophogaster is a genus of moths of the Phaudidae family.

Species
Alophogaster ludius Jordan, 1925
Alophogaster melli Hering, 1925
Alophogaster overdijkinki Joicey & Talbot, 1925
Alophogaster rubribasis Hampson, 1892
Alophogaster serraticornis Hampson, 1896
Alophogaster tensipennis Walker, 1862

References

Phaudinae
Zygaenoidea genera